Retiro is a genus of South American and Central American tangled nest spiders first described by Cândido Firmino de Mello-Leitão in 1915.

Species
 it contains twelve species:
Retiro crinitus (Simon, 1893) — Venezuela
Retiro fulvipes (Simon, 1906) — Ecuador
[[Retiro granadensis (Keyserling, 1878) — Colombia
Retiro gratus (Bryant, 1948) — Hispaniola
Retiro lanceolatus (Vellard, 1924) — Brazil
Retiro maculatus Mello-Leitão, 1915 — Brazil
Retiro nigronotatus Mello-Leitão, 1947 — Brazil
Retiro plagiatus (Simon, 1893) — Venezuela
Retiro procerulus (Simon, 1906) — Ecuador
Retiro quitensis (Simon, 1906) — Ecuador
Retiro rhombifer (Simon, 1906) — Ecuador
Retiro roberti (Reimoser, 1939) — Costa Rica

References

Amaurobiidae
Araneomorphae genera